The Republic of Korea Navy has about 160 ships in commission (a total displacement of about 232,285 tonnes).

The vessels are categorized into four levels. A first-rate ship (Sohn Wonyil-class SS, DDG, DDH, LPH, MLS, and AOE) is commanded by a captain; a second-rate ship (SS, FFG, FF, PCC, LST, ATS, and ASR) by a commander; a third-rate ship (PKG, MSH, and MHC) by a lieutenant commander; and a fourth-rate craft (PKMR, PKM, and LSF) is commanded by a lieutenant or a warrant officer.

The ROK Navy employs the U.S. Navy-style letter based hull classification symbols to designate the types of its ships and hull numbers to uniquely identify its vessels (e.g. DDH 975). The names are that of the historical figures, provinces, cities, counties, peaks, lakes, islands, and birds. The Chief of Naval Operations selects the names of ships.

The ship prefix for all the commissioned ROK Navy ship is ROKS (Republic of Korea Ship) when the names of ships are written in English.

Submarine fleet

Submarines
Submarines (SS) are named after historical figures.

Surface fleet

Destroyers
Destroyers (DDG, DDH) are named after historical figures.

Frigates
Frigates (FFG, FF) are named after provinces and large cities that names previous ROK Navy destroyers had.

Corvettes
Corvettes (PCC) are named after cities, with the exception of Sinseong (one of Admiral Yi Sunshin's battle grounds).

Patrol vessels
Yoon Youngha class (PKG) is named for Navy heroes.

Chamsuri (PKM) means the sea eagle in Korean.

Amphibious warfare ships
Dokdo class (LPH) is named for islands. Cheonwangbong class and Gojunbong (LST) class are named for mountain peaks.

Solgae (LSF) means the black kite in Korean.

Mine warfare ships
Nampo class and Wonsan class (MLS) are named after places known for naval mine operations during the Korean War.

Yangyang class (MSH) is named for sea-side counties. Ganggyeong class (MHC) is named for towns that names are previously used by decommissioned minesweepers.

Auxiliary ships
ATH is named for an island where Admiral Yi Sunshin's HQ was located. AOEs are named for lakes.

Tongyeong class have legacy names of previous ROK Navy ships. ASR is named for a base established by Commissioner Chang Bogo.

Singiwon and Sinsegi (AGS) mean a new era and a new century in Korean, respectively.

Mulgae (LCU) means the fur seal in Korean.

Major service craft
The hull number of service craft starts with Hangul. Service craft have no name.

See also
 List of ships of the Republic of Korea Navy

Notes
a. Hull number: The ROK Navy does not use the number '4' when assigning hull numbers to their ships since ROKS Jirisan (PC 704; formerly USS PC-810), during the Korean War, struck a mine and sank in December 1951, resulting in death of all sailors aboard. Currently only the hull numbers of the mine layers and submarine tender end with number '0'. The hull numbers of the submarines start with the number '0'.
b. Romanization of Ship names: Romanization is according to Revised Romanization of Korean (adopted in 2000), with exceptions of personal names. Names of ships commissioned before 2000 might have been romanized according to McCune–Reischauer. Examples of changes (M-R → RR): Chinhae → Jinhae; Kangnung → Gangneung; Kimpo → Gimpo; Kyongju → Gyeongju; Pusan → Busan; Taegu → Daegu.
c. Delivery date: The date when the ROK Navy acquires a ship from the shipbuilder.

References

External links
 Republic of Korea Navy official website (Korean) (English)
 South Korea navy ships GlobalSecurity.org
 World Navies Today: South Korea Haze Gray & Underway: World Navies Today

South Korean military-related lists
 
Korea, South